The Court of Appeal of Kenya is established under Article 164 of the constitution of Kenya and consists of a number of judges, being not fewer than twelve.

The court handles appeals arising over the decisions of the High Court of Kenya, the Environment & Land Court and the Employment & Labour Relations Court as well as any other court or tribunal as provided for in law. The judges of the Court of Appeal elect one Judge to represent them on the Judicial Service Commission.

The Court of Appeal currently has six registries, one each in Nairobi, Mombasa, Nyeri, Kisumu, Nakuru and Eldoret.

Composition
The Constitution and the Court of Appeal (Organization and Administration) Act, 2015 set the minimum number of Court of Appeal Judges at 12 while the Judicature Act sets the maximum at 30.

Each case is heard by a collegiate bench with an odd number of Judges subject to a minimum of three Judges. In practice, however, nearly all cases are heard by a three-judge bench. A few exceptional cases have been heard by five or seven judges.

The court is headed by a President of the Court of Appeal who is elected by the Judges of the Court from among themselves. The current President of the Court is Hon. Justice Daniel Isokolo Musinga who was elected on May 24, 2021.

Current justices
The following are the current members of the Court of Appeal:
Mr. Daniel Isokolo Musinga - President, Court of Appeal
Lady Justice Wanjiru Karanja
Lady Justice H. M. Okwengu
Mr. Justice M. Warsame (Commissioner to the JSC)
Mr. Justice M.S.A. Makhandia
Mr. Justice Patrick O. Kiage
Mr. Justice S. Gatembu Kairu
Mr. Justice Kathurima M’inoti
Lady Justice Agnes K. Murgor 
Lady Justice Fatuma Sichale
Lady Justice Jamila Mohammed
Mr. Justice Sankale Ole Kantai
Lady Justice Hellen Omondi
Mr. Justice Francis Tuiyott
Lady Justice Jessie Lesiit
Lady Justice Mumbi Ngugi
Lady Justice Pauline Nyamweya
Mr. Justice Imaana Laibuta
Mr. Justice Luka Kiprotich Kimaru
Mr. Justice Paul Mwaniki Gachoka
Lady Justice Lydia Awino Achode
Mr. Justice Frederick Andago Ochieng
Mr. Justice John Mutinga Mativo
Lady Justice Grace Wangui Ngenye
Lady Justice Abida Ali Aroni 
Mr. Justice Aggrey Muchelule
Mr. Justice Weldon Korir
Mr. Justice George Vincent Odunga
Mr. Justice (Prof) Joel Ngugi

Former justices
The following are former members of the Court of Appeal:
 Hon. Lady Justice Martha Koome - appointed as the Chief Justice on May 19, 2021
Hon. Justice William Ouko, former President of the Court of Appeal - appointed as Judge of the Supreme Court on May 11, 2021
Hon. Mr. Justice Erastus M. Githinji - retired in December 2019, appointed by President Kenyatta to chair Tax Appeals Tribunal
 Hon. Mr. Justice (Prof.) James Otieno Odek - died December 16, 2019
 Hon. Mr. Justice Philip N Waki - retired in October 2019
 Hon. Mr. Justice Alnashir R M Visram - retired in August 2019
 Hon. Mr. Justice John Walter Onyango Otieno - retired
 Hon. Mr. Justice Festus Azangalala - retired
 Hon. Mr. Justice Paul Kihara Kariuki, former President of the Court of Appeal - Appointed Attorney General in March 2018
 Hon. Lady Justice Philomena Mwilu - Appointed Deputy Chief Justice & Vice President of the Supreme Court
 Hon. Mr. Justice David Kenani Maraga - Appointed Chief Justice & President of the Supreme Court
 Hon. Mr. Justice John Wycliffe Mwera - Retired
 Hon. Mr. Justice Johnson Evans Gicheru – Former Chief Justice under the repealed Constitution, retired on February 27, 2011, and died on December 25, 2020
 Hon. Mr. Justice Philip Kiptoo Tunoi - Appointed Judge of the Supreme Court on June 16, 2011
 Hon. Mr. Justice M Ole Keiwua - died October 8, 2011
 Hon. Lady Justice Kalpana Rawal - Appointed Judge of the Supreme Court on June 3, 2013
 Hon. Mr. Justice Riaga S C Omolo - found unsuitable to continue serving by the Judges & Magistrates Vetting Board
 Hon. Mr. Justice Samuel E O Bosire - found unsuitable to continue serving by the Judges & Magistrates Vetting Board
 Hon. Mr. Justice Emmanuel O'kubasu - found unsuitable to continue serving by the Judges & Magistrates Vetting Board
 Hon. Mr. Justice J G Nyamu - found unsuitable to continue serving by the Judges & Magistrates Vetting Board
 Hon. Lady Justice Effie Owuor
 Hon. Lady Justice Joyce Aluoch
Hon. Justice Aaron Ringera
Hon. Lady Justice R. Nambuye
Hon. Mr. Justice Msagha Mbogholi

Jurisdiction
The Court of Appeal has jurisdiction to hear appeals from the High Court, the Environment & Land Court and the Employment & Labour Relations Court. It also has jurisdiction to hear appeals from any other court or tribunal as prescribed by an Act of Parliament. It also hears contempt of court as original jurisdiction.

References

External links
 Official Website

Government of Kenya
Judiciary of Kenya
Courts and tribunals with year of establishment missing